Mispila parallela is a species of beetle in the family Cerambycidae. It was described by Stephan von Breuning in 1937. It is known from Borneo.

References

parallela
Beetles described in 1937